A number of ships of the French Navy have borne the name Astrée in honour of Astraea in Greek mythology.

Ships named Astrée 
 , a 24-gun frigate
 , a 30-gun frigate.
 , a 28-gun corvette.
 , a 40-gun Nymphe-class frigate.
 , a 44-gun frigate.
 , a 46-gun frigate.
 , a sail and steam frigate.
 , an  submarine.
 , an  submarine.

See also

Notes and references

Notes

References

Bibliography 
 
 

French Navy ship names